Mochishche Aerodrome is a sports aerodrome near Novosibirsk, Russia (12 km northeast of the city). It is used for basing and flying of general aviation aircraft, experimental aviation and parachute jumps.

History
Since 2001, airshows are held at the airport every year.

References

External links
 Official website

Airports in Novosibirsk Oblast